David Stewart (21 May 1924 — 2 May 2006) was a Scottish first-class cricketer.

Stewart was born at Perth in May 1924 and was educated there at Perth Academy. A club cricketer for Perthshire, Stewart made a single appearance in first-class cricket for Scotland against Ireland at Perth in 1950. He took 2 wickets for 12 runs in the Ireland first innings with his right-arm medium pace bowling, dismissing Stanley Bergin and Roderick Gill. He batted twice in the match, being dismissed for 2 runs in the Scotland first innings by James Boucher, while in their second innings he ended unbeaten on 5. Outside of cricket, Stewart was a Meat and Livestock Commission Office manager. He died at Perth in May 2006.

References

External links
 

1924 births
2006 deaths
Cricketers from Perth, Scotland
People educated at Perth Academy
Scottish cricketers